Teatret Vårt is a regional theatre for Møre og Romsdal county, Norway. It was established in 1972 and is based in Molde. The theatre cooperates with the annual Molde International Jazz Festival. Carl Morten Amundsen has been the theatre director since 2000.

References

Theatres in Norway
Culture in Møre og Romsdal
1972 establishments in Norway
Buildings and structures in Molde